In chemical graph theory, the Padmakar–Ivan (PI) index is a topological index of a molecule, used in biochemistry. The Padmakar–Ivan index is a generalization introduced by Padmakar V. Khadikar and Iván Gutman of the concept of the Wiener index, introduced by Harry Wiener. The Padmakar–Ivan index of a graph G is the sum over all edges  uv of  G of number of edges which are not equidistant from u  and v.
The Padmakar–Ivan index of a graph G is defined as

 

The PI index is very important in the study of quantitative structure–activity relationship for the classification models used in the chemical, biological sciences, engineering, and nanotechnology.

Examples
The PI index of Dendrimer Nanostar of the following figure can be calculated by

References

Mathematical chemistry
Cheminformatics
Graph invariants